Ghattu is a Mandal in Jogulamba Gadwal district, Telangana, India.

It is one of the under-developed villages in the Jogulamba Gadwal district. Ghattu is a mandal by its category but originally it is unaware of the developments. It has begun to see the developmental activities performed by the government.

The major festivals celebrated here are namely Dussehra, Eruvaka, Muharram, etc., Irrespective of the religions, People on these days gather together sharing their feelings and express gratitude towards each other. Regionally, On every Wednesday the village panchayat conducts market stalls. People from different villages around this mandal come to buy their basic needs.

Institutions
 Zilla Parishad High School
 2 primary schools
 Government Model School
 Government Junior College (T/M)
   GROUPS: CEC, HEC.

Villages
The villages in Ghattu mandal include:
 Aloor 	
 Aragidda 	
 Balgera 	
 Boyalagudem 	
 Chagadona 	
 Chintalakunta 	
 Ersandoddi 	
 Ghattu
 Gorlakhandoddi 	
 Induvasi 		
 Kuchinerla 	
 Lingapoor 	
 Macherla 	
 Mallampally 	
 Mallapuram
 Mittadoddi 		
 Penchikalpahad 	
 Rayapuram 	
 Thappetlamorsu 	
 Thummalapally 	
 Thummalcheruvu 	
 Yellamdoddi

References

Mandals in Jogulamba Gadwal district